This is a list of billionaire (USD) space travellers.

List

References

See also
 Billionaire space race
 List of billionaires
 List of astronauts

Spacetravellers
Billionaire space travellers
Billionaire space travellers